The Canned Bride (German: Die Konservenbraut) is a 1915 German silent comedy film directed by Robert Wiene and starring Margarete Kupfer, Senta Söneland and Bogia Horska.

Cast
 Margarete Kupfer   
 Bogia Horska   
 Senta Söneland 
 Paul Biensfeldt   
 Guido Herzfeld

Bibliography
 Jung, Uli & Schatzberg, Walter. Beyond Caligari: The Films of Robert Wiene. Berghahn Books, 1999.

External links

1915 films
Films of the German Empire
German silent feature films
German comedy films
Films directed by Robert Wiene
German black-and-white films
1915 comedy films
Silent comedy films
1910s German films